All Tvvins are an Irish pop band from Dublin. In 2016, the band released their debut album, llVV, which debuted at number 2 on the Irish charts. In 2019 they released "Just to Exist" under Faction Records label.

Composed of former members of DIY math-rock bands Adebisi Shank and The Cast of Cheers, the new project marks a sharp turn into commercial pop music, signing with Warner Music.

Discography

Singles 

 "Thank You" (2014)
 "Too Young To Live" (2015)
 "Darkest Ocean" (2015)
 "Unbelievable" (2016)
 "These 4 Words" (2016)
 "Book" (2016) 
 "Resurrect Me" (2016) 

"Too Much Silence" (2016)
"End Of The Day" (2016)
"Alone Together" (2017)
"Hell Of A Party" (2019)
"Build A Bridge" (2019)
"Infinite Swim" (2019)
"Divine" (2019)
"Hope It Don't" (2020)
"Something Special" (2021)

Studio albums 

 llVV (2016)
 Just to Exist (2019)

References

External links 
Official website

Irish alternative rock groups
Dew Process artists